Candice Renee Price is an African-American mathematician and is an Associate professor at Smith College. She, along with Erica Graham, Raegan Higgins, and Shelby Wilson created the website Mathematically Gifted and Black which features the contributions of modern-day black mathematicians. She is an advocate for greater representation of females and people of color in the STEM fields. Price's area of mathematical research is DNA topology.

Education 
Price has a bachelor's degree (2003) in Mathematics from California State University, Chico and a master's degree (2007) from San Francisco State University. She earned her doctoral degree (2012) in mathematics from the University of Iowa under the advisement of Isabel Darcy.

Career and Research 
Price was a 2013 MAA Project NExT fellow. She is currently  an Associate professor at Smith College. She previously held similar positions at the University of San Diego and West Point (United States Military Academy).

Price is one of the founding organizers of the Underrepresented Students in Topology and Algebra Research Symposium (USTARS) whose inaugural meeting was in 2011. This annual symposium is a multi-day event that features the research of algebra and topology graduate students as well as providing career and professional development opportunities. In 2017, Price is one of four mathematicians that started the website Mathematically Gifted and Black, for which she was awarded the 2022 Presidential Recognition Award of the Association for Women in Mathematics (AWM). Coinciding with Black History Month, every day in February they highlight the life and works of modern-day black mathematicians. She co-delivered an invited plenary address at the 2021 National Math Festival. She will deliver a Mathematical Association of America (MAA) invited lecture at MathFest 2021.

References

External Links 
http://mathematicallygiftedandblack.com which features the contributions of modern-day black mathematicians.
http://www.candicerprice.com
Meet a Mathematician! Video Interview

Year of birth missing (living people)
Living people
21st-century American mathematicians
American women mathematicians
African-American mathematicians
California State University, Chico alumni
San Francisco State University alumni
University of Iowa alumni
University of San Diego faculty
United States Military Academy faculty
Smith College faculty
21st-century women mathematicians
21st-century American women
21st-century African-American women
21st-century African-American people